Shuvoye is a settlement in Yegoryevsky District of Moscow Oblast, Russia, located on the Shuvoyka River (Guslitsa's tributary).  Shuvoye is the administrative center of Shuvoyskoye Rural Settlement.  Postal code: 140342. Dialing code: +7 49640.

History 
The settlement was founded in 1627.  In 1935, it was granted urban-type settlement status.  During Soviet times, it was called Krasny Tkach (lit. red weaver); the original name was restored in August 2001.  In December 2001, it was demoted to a settlement of rural type.

The settlement is located in the historical area of Guslitsa.  There is a wooden Old Believers' (Russian Orthodox Old-Rite Church) Trinity Church built in 1924 in Shuvoye.

References
А. И. Капустина Приход Шувое-Нареево Егорьевского района Московской области.

External links
Temples.ru  Pictures of the Trinity Church in Shuvoye

Rural localities in Moscow Oblast
Old Believer communities in Russia
Populated places established in 1627
1627 establishments in Russia
Moscow Governorate